Hellzapoppin is the first full-length album by the New Zealand band the 3Ds, released in 1992.

The album peaked at No. 24 on the New Zealand albums chart.

Production
The album was recorded at Fish Street Studio, in Dunedin, New Zealand.

Critical reception
Trouser Press wrote: "Overstuffed with the Davids’ punchy guitar lines and fervently chased by their sing-songy vocal shouts, 'Outer Space' perfectly captures the group’s spastic energy and crisp melodicism." Spin placed the album at No. 1 on its list of "10 Best Albums You Didn't Hear In '92", and praised the "sprawling, skywriting six-string heroics."

Track listing
Side one
"Outer Space" – 3:14
"Ugly Day" – 2:52
"Sunken Head" – 3:45
"Swallow" – 2:44
"Sunken Treasure" – 3:48
"Hellzapoppin'" – 2:22

Side two
"Leave the Dogs to Play" – 3:19
"Hairs" – 2:37
"Something in the Water" – 2:22
"Homo Necans" – 3:20
"One Eye Opened" – 2:32
"Teacher Is Dead" – 3:05
"Jewel" – 4:05
Bonus track
"Baby's on Fire" (Brian Eno) – 4:10 (B-side to the "Outer Space" 7" single)

Personnel
David Mitchell – guitar, vocals
Denise Roughan – bass guitar, keyboards, vocals
David Saunders – guitar, vocals
Dominic Stones – drums

References

The 3Ds albums
1992 albums
Festival Records albums
Flying Nun Records albums